is a small volcanic deserted island in the Philippine Sea approximately  south of Tokyo, and  west of Hachijō-jima, in the northern Izu archipelago, Japan. Administratively the island is within Hachijō, Tokyo, Japan.

Geography

Oriented in the same northwest to southeast direction as Hachijō-jima, the 1.3 × 3 km Hachijōkojima is surrounded by high cliffs. Located in the Kuroshio Current, the area has abundant sea life, and is popular with sports fishermen and scuba divers.

History
During the Heian period, Minamoto no Tametomo was banished to Izu Ōshima after a failed rebellion, but per a semi-legendary story, escaped to Hachijōjima, where he attempted to establish an independent kingdom, and he built his castle on the more easily defended Hachijōkojima. Although the legend has not been verified with historical or archaeological evidence, Hachijōkojima has been inhabited since at least the Muromachi period. As with neighboring Hachijōjima, during the Edo period, the island was a place for exile of convicts. As the strait separating Hachijōkojima from Hachijōjima has a strong current preventing escape by raft or swimming, the more serious criminals were isolated on the island. Its use as a prison came to an end in the Meiji period. These hamlets became part of the town of Hachijō in 1955. The population peaked at 513 residents in the Meiji period, but by 1955 the population had shrunk to only 50. In 1965, the remaining residents voted to abandon the island, citing lack of basic public services (including electricity, health care and schools) and the island's inability to support more than a very basic subsistence lifestyle. There have been no residents of Hachijōkojima since 1969, when the last group of 31 left the island.

See also 

 Battle Royale (film), a controversial 2000 film filmed on Hachijōkojima although not set on the island.
 Desert island
 List of islands
 List of volcanoes in Japan

References

 Teikoku's Complete Atlas of Japan, Teikoku-Shoin Co., Ltd. Tokyo 1990,

External links

Izu Islands
Uninhabited islands of Japan
Former populated places in Japan
Extinct volcanoes
Islands of Tokyo